Love Watches is a lost 1918 American silent feature comedy-drama film directed by Henry Houry and starring Corinne Griffith. It was produced and distributed by the Vitagraph Company of America. A Broadway play produced by Charles Frohman starred Billie Burke in 1908.

Plot
As described in a film magazine, although her aunt had planned that Jacqueline Cartaret (Griffith) would marry the bookworm Ernest Augarde (Vane), Jacqueline loves Andre de Juvigny (Burns) and they are eventually married. But Andre previously had a flirtation with Lucia de Morfontaine (Deshon), and when Jacqueline hears of this she makes Andre promise to never see Lucia again. When Lucia calls on Andre when Jacqueline is out, Jacqueline, angered, decides to pay him back and starts a flirtation with Ernest, which arouses the jealousy of his lady secretary. However, Andre is confident of Jacqueline's consistency, and when Ernest learns that the woman he loved has used him as a dupe, he readily turns to his secretary for consolation.

Cast
 Corinne Griffith as Jacqueline Cartaret
 Denton Vane as Ernest Augarde
 Florence Deshon as Lucia de Morfontaine
 Edmund Burns as Count Andre de Juvigny
 Julia Swayne Gordon as Marquise de Javigny
 Alice Terry as Charlotte Bernier
 Nellie Parker Spaulding as Sophie
 Charles A. Stevenson as Cartaret
 Carola Carson as Baroness
 Alice Nash as Christine
 Edna Nash as Solange

References

External links
 
 
 Lantern glass slide

1918 films
American silent feature films
Lost American films
American films based on plays
Vitagraph Studios films
American black-and-white films
1910s English-language films
Films set in France
Films directed by Henry Houry
1918 comedy-drama films
1918 lost films
Lost comedy-drama films
1910s American films
Silent American comedy-drama films